The Inge Morath Foundation was a privately operating non-profit foundation headquartered in New York, New York. The Foundation was established in 2003 to facilitate the study and appreciation of Inge Morath's contribution to photography. Morath was a member of Magnum Photos.

The Foundation also supported work in three program areas: grants and awards, educational programs, and traveling exhibitions.

See also
 Inge Morath Award

References

External links

 Magnum Photos

Photography foundations
Arts foundations based in the United States
Arts organizations based in New York City
Arts organizations established in 2003
2003 establishments in the United States
American photography organizations